The red-cheeked wattle-eye (Platysteira blissetti) is a species of bird in the family Platysteiridae.
It is found in Cameroon, Ivory Coast, Ghana, Guinea, Liberia, Nigeria, Sierra Leone, and Togo.
Its natural habitat is subtropical or tropical moist lowland forests.

References

red-cheeked wattle-eye
Birds of West Africa
red-cheeked wattle-eye
Taxonomy articles created by Polbot
Taxobox binomials not recognized by IUCN